Rose Butler (November 1799 – 1819) was an enslaved domestic worker in New York City. In July 1819, she was hanged for arson. At the time, the only capital crimes in New York State were first-degree arson and murder. She was the last person executed in New York State for arson.

Rose Butler's execution was a watershed in many respects. The context surrounding her crime and sentencing highlights community anxieties, shifting ideologies on race and status, and gives a glimpse of what the institution of slavery was like in New York City, a subject that is seldom discussed.

Early life 
Butler was born in November 1799, in Mount Pleasant, New York. She was described as intelligent and having had "the benefit of instruction". She lived with a Colonel Straing, at Mount Pleasant, and was sold to various households later moved to New York City in order to live with Abraham Child. In 1817, she moved to live with William L. Morris.

Arson conviction and death sentence 
In 1819, Butler was arrested for arson. She was charged with attempting to burn down the family home with the family inside; the damage was minor, but she was convicted and sentenced to death. The New York Supreme Court, after an appeal, ruled that what she did constituted first-degree arson. The hanging attracted 10,000 spectators.

The following doggerel lines were recalled 50 years later as having been "chalked about the fences":
Rose Butler sat upon a bench—
Down drop't the trap and hanged a negro wench.

Media
 Rose Dies Friday (2019) by Annette Daniels Taylor, a short film (8:21) whose creator calls it a "cinematic poem".

Archival material 
The New-York Historical Society holds "a confession, statements, and an affidavit", a total of 7 items. Included is a statement of Eliza Duell, a white woman placed in the apartment holding Butler during her arrest.

References

1799 births
1819 deaths
American people convicted of arson
American rebel slaves
American freedmen
People executed by New York (state) by hanging
19th-century American slaves
People from Mount Pleasant, New York
People from New York City